Amzad Hossain is a Bangladesh Nationalist Party politician and the former Member of Parliament of Meherpur-2.

Career
Hossain was elected to parliament from Meherpur-2 as a Bangladesh Nationalist Party candidate in 2008.

References

Bangladesh Nationalist Party politicians
Living people
9th Jatiya Sangsad members
Year of birth missing (living people)